Sidney Harman (August 4, 1918 – April 12, 2011) was a Canadian-born American engineer and businessman active in education, government, industry, and publishing. He was the Chairman Emeritus of Harman International Industries, Inc. A co-founder of Harman Kardon, he also served as the U.S. Under Secretary of Commerce in 1977 and 1978. Late in his life, Harman was also the publisher of Newsweek, having purchased the magazine for one dollar in 2010.

Early life
Harman was born in Montreal, Quebec, Canada and raised in New York City. Harman's father worked at a hearing aid company in New York.

Career
After graduating with a physics degree, Sidney's first job was at the David Bogen Company as an engineer. His boss was Bernard Kardon, and roughly thirteen years later each invested $5,000 to make the Festival D1000, the world's first integrated hi-fi receiver. Harman and Kardon founded Harman Kardon in 1953. He was known for the quality of working life programs that he initiated at the company’s plants, especially for the program at Bolivar, Tennessee, which had some short-lived success and has become a model for such activities in American industry and a principal case study at business schools in the United States and abroad.  Harman had written on productivity, quality of working life and economic policy, and was co-author, with Daniel Yankelovich, of Starting With the People, published by Houghton Mifflin in 1988.

In the 1970s, Sidney Harman accepted an appointment in the Carter administration as undersecretary of the United States Department of Commerce. When Harman took office in 1976, he sold his company to conglomerate Beatrice Foods to avoid a conflict of interest. Beatrice promptly sold many portions of the company, including the original Harman Kardon division, and by 1980 only 60% of the original company remained.

After he left government in 1978, he reacquired a number of businesses of Harman International he had sold to Beatrice. The company continued its growth plan with a string of acquisitions throughout the 1980s that pushed Harman International's sales from about $80 million in 1981 to more than $200 million by 1986, and then to more than $500 million by 1989.

Education and philanthropy
Harman (Ph.D. in Higher Education, Union Institute & University, 1973), a graduate of Baruch College of the City University of New York in 1939, served as a trustee of the Martin Luther King Center for Social Change, the Los Angeles Philharmonic Association and the National Symphony Orchestra. He was chairman of the Executive Committee of the Board of the Public Agenda Foundation; chairman of the Executive Committee of the Board of Business Executives for National Security; a member of the Council on Foreign Relations and the U.S. Council on Competitiveness; and a member of the Board of the Leadership Institute of the University of Southern California.

He served for three years as president of Friends World College, a worldwide, experimental Quaker College, and was the founder and an active member of the Program on Technology, Public Policy, and Human Development at the John F. Kennedy School of Government at Harvard University.  Harman was chairman of the Program Committee of the Board of the Aspen Institute for Humanistic Studies and a member of the Board of the Carter Center of Emory University.

He was a philanthropist and a member of Washington, D.C.’s Shakespeare Theatre Company Board of Trustees.  The Company’s new Harman Center for the Arts is named for his family with a performance space, Sidney Harman Hall, named for him.  He also endowed the Baruch College Harman Writer-In-Residence visiting Professorship.

The University of Southern California Lloyd Greif Center for Entrepreneurial Studies named Harman the "Entrepreneur of the Year 2007".

Harman served as a major contributor to Israeli and Zionist causes during much of his lifetime.

Personal life
Harman was married to the former Sylvia Stern for 25 years and had four children with her. They continued an amicable relationship until her death.  His second wife was Jane Harman (born 1945), a former Democratic member of Congress from California who represented California's 36th congressional district, which included the Redondo Beach and Manhattan Beach areas of southern California.

Later years and death
Harman displayed a remarkable amount of energy into his 80s, staying active by playing golf and engaging in various other hobbies. He remained involved in the day-to-day management of Harman Kardon until formally retiring on his 88th birthday in August 2006.  After turning 90 in 2008, he remarked "I don't feel much different than I did at 70. Maybe a little bit, but nothing has significantly diminished."

Harman died on April 12, 2011, in Washington, D.C., at the age of 92 of complications from acute myeloid leukemia.

Newsweek
Less than a year before his death, in August 2010, Harman bought Newsweek magazine from The Washington Post Company, paying $1 and accepting the assumption of $47 million in liabilities.

On July 24, 2012, the Harman family only held a minority stake in Newsweek.

References

External links 
 History of Harman International Industries Inc.
 Leslie Milk and Ellen Ryan. "Washingtonians of the Year 2007: Sidney Harman", Washingtonian, January 1, 2008.
 USC Website
 2008 USA Today article about the effectiveness of old and young CEOs
 Jonathan Alter. "Sidney Harman: An Extraordinary Life".  The Daily Beast, April 13, 2011.
Sidney Harman Interview NAMM Oral History Library (2008)

1918 births
2011 deaths
American audio engineers
American magazine publishers (people)
Businesspeople from California
Businesspeople from Montreal
Harvard Kennedy School people
California Democrats
Union Institute & University alumni
Carter administration personnel
United States Under Secretaries of Commerce
20th-century American businesspeople
20th-century American philanthropists
Canadian emigrants to the United States